Phebalium festivum, commonly known as dainty phebalium, is a species of spreading shrub that is endemic to Victoria, Australia. It has smooth branchlets, broadly egg-shaped, warty leaves and three to ten white or pale yellow flowers arranged in umbels on the ends of branchlets.

Description
It has mostly smooth branchlets densely covered with rust-coloured scales. Flowering occurs in spring and summer.

Taxonomy and naming
Phebalium festivum was first formally described in 1998 by Paul Wilson in the journal Nuytsia from specimens collected at Flagstaff Hill near Eaglehawk in 1952. The specific epithet refers to the "pleasant aspect of the plant when in flower".

Distribution and habitat
Phebalium festivum grows in forest near Bendigo in western Victoria.

References

festivum
Flora of Victoria (Australia)
Plants described in 1998
Taxa named by Paul G. Wilson